Schikaneder is a German surname. Notable people with the surname include:

 Emanuel Schikaneder (1751–1812), German impresario and librettist
 Jakub Schikaneder (1855–1924), Czech painter
 Karl Schikaneder (1773–1845), actor, poet, and composer

German-language surnames